Krivodino is a rural locality (a village) in Yurovskoye Rural Settlement, Gryazovetsky District, Vologda Oblast, Russia. The population was 120 as of 2002. There are 6 streets.

Geography 
Krivodino is located 22 km northwest of Gryazovets (the district's administrative centre) by road. Yurovo is the nearest rural locality.

References 

Rural localities in Gryazovetsky District